Sail Mhor (767 m) is a mountain in the Northwest Highlands, Scotland. It lies in Wester Ross, close to the remote hamlet of Dundonnell and south of Ullapool.

Sail Mhor is at the western end of a long ridge that extends down from An Teallach. Lying just south of Little Loch Broom, the views from its summit towards the coast and to the Summer Isles beyond are fantastic.

References

Mountains and hills of the Northwest Highlands
Marilyns of Scotland
Corbetts